Emīls Ģēģeris (born 23 July 1999) is a Latvian ice hockey forward playing for Anglet Hormadi Èlite.

References

External links

1999 births
Living people
Latvian ice hockey forwards
Dinamo Riga players
Ice hockey people from Riga#